Siege of Chartres may refer to:
Siege of Chartres (911)
Siege of Chartres (1360)
Siege of Chartres (1568)